Cloverdale-Idlewild is a neighborhood in Montgomery, Alabama. It is circumscribed by Edgemont Street, Norman Bridge Road, Fairview Avenue, and Audubon Road.

History
The neighborhood is built on land occupied by John Gindratt, who acquired the land in 1817 and established a plantation there. His house stood where Mastin Lane runs today. The next notable occupant in the area was John B. Mastin, who built a family home called "Fairview", for which Fairview Avenue is named; Mastin Lane is named for the family.

The Cloverdale-Idlewild neighborhood was developed in the 1930s.  The area has been experiencing a resurgence in recent years as part of a trend of people moving away from suburbia and into cities.

The neighborhood was designated a local historic district by the city in 2001.

References

External links
Area map
Cloverdale Idlewild Association (CIA)

Geography of Montgomery, Alabama
Historic districts in Montgomery, Alabama